Acrasia may refer to:

 Akrasia, the state of acting against one's better judgement
 Acrasia (horse), a racing horse, 1904 Melbourne Cup winner
 Acrasia (moth), a geometer moth genus
 Acrasia (protists), a proposed phylum of protists
 Acrasia, a character in Edmund Spenser's epic poem The Faerie Queene

See also
 Acrasin